Harry Jefferson may refer to:
 Harry Jefferson (racing driver) (born 1946), American NASCAR driver
 Harry Jefferson (sailor) (1849–1918), British sailor 
 Harry R. Jefferson, (1899–1966) American football, basketball, and baseball coach and college athletics administrator